Terry Wayne Bogener (born September 28, 1955) is a former Major League Baseball outfielder who played for one season. He played for the Texas Rangers for 24 games during the 1982 Texas Rangers season.

External links
, or Retrosheet
Pura Pelota (Venezuelan Winter League)

1955 births
Living people
Baseball players from Missouri
Charleston Charlies players
Charlotte O's players
Denver Bears players
Gulf Coast Rangers players
Major League Baseball outfielders
Miami Marlins (IL) players
Navegantes del Magallanes players
American expatriate baseball players in Venezuela
Oklahoma City 89ers players
Oklahoma Sooners baseball players
People from Hannibal, Missouri
Texas Rangers players
Tulsa Drillers players
Wichita Aeros players